Simon Peak may refer to several places:

 Simon Peak (Antarctica)
 Simon Peak (Canada), the highest peak on the Mount Fraser massif on the Alberta/B.C. continental divide